The 2018–19 Detroit Mercy Titans men's basketball team represented the University of Detroit Mercy during the 2018–19 NCAA Division I men's basketball season. The Titans, led by first-year head coach Mike Davis, played their home games at Calihan Hall as members of the Horizon League. They finished the season 11–20 overall, 8–10 in Horizon League play, ending in a 3-way tie for sixth place. As the No. 7 seed in the Horizon League tournament, they lost in the quarterfinals to eventual tournament champion Northern Kentucky,

Previous season
The Titans finished the season 8–24, 4–14 in Horizon League play to finish in last place. They lost in the first round of the Horizon League tournament to Green Bay.

On March 26, 2018, the school fired head coach Bacari Alexander after two seasons. On June 13, the school hired Texas Southern head coach Mike Davis as the Titans' new coach.

Departures

Roster

Schedule and results

|-
!colspan=9 style=| Exhibition

|-
!colspan=9 style=| Non-conference regular season

|-
!colspan=9 style=| Horizon League regular season

|-
!colspan=9 style=| Horizon League tournament
|-

|-

References

Detroit Titans
Detroit Mercy Titans men's basketball seasons
Detroit Titans men's b
Detroit Titans men's b